Psalm 86 is the 86th psalm of the Book of Psalms. It is attributed to David. In the slightly different numbering system used in the Greek Septuagint and Latin Vulgate translations of the Bible, this psalm is Psalm 85.

In the English of the King James Version, it begins "Bow down thine ear, O Lord, hear me: for I am poor and needy". In Latin, it is known as "Inclina Domine".

The psalm forms a regular part of Jewish, Catholic, Lutheran, Anglican and other Protestant liturgies. It has been paraphrased in hymns and set to music, including settings by Heinrich Schütz in German and Basil Harwood in Latin. Henry Purcell and Gustav Holst composed elaborate anthems in English. In Mendelssohn's Elijah, three verses from Psalm 86 are used in the narration.

Text

Hebrew Bible version 
Following is the Hebrew text of Psalm 86:

King James Version 
 A Prayer of David
 Bow down thine ear, O LORD, hear me: for I am poor and needy.
 Preserve my soul; for I am holy: O thou my God, save thy servant that trusteth in thee.
 Be merciful unto me, O Lord: for I cry unto thee daily.
 Rejoice the soul of thy servant: for unto thee, O Lord, do I lift up my soul.
 For thou, Lord, art good, and ready to forgive; and plenteous in mercy unto all them that call upon thee.
 Give ear, O LORD, unto my prayer; and attend to the voice of my supplications.
 In the day of my trouble I will call upon thee: for thou wilt answer me.
 Among the gods there is none like unto thee, O Lord; neither are there any works like unto thy works.
 All nations whom thou hast made shall come and worship before thee, O Lord; and shall glorify thy name.
 For thou art great, and doest wondrous things: thou art God alone.
 Teach me thy way, O LORD; I will walk in thy truth: unite my heart to fear thy name.
 I will praise thee, O Lord my God, with all my heart: and I will glorify thy name for evermore.
 For great is thy mercy toward me: and thou hast delivered my soul from the lowest hell.
 O God, the proud are risen against me, and the assemblies of violent men have sought after my soul; and have not set thee before them.
 But thou, O Lord, art a God full of compassion, and gracious, longsuffering, and plenteous in mercy and truth.
 O turn unto me, and have mercy upon me; give thy strength unto thy servant, and save the son of thine handmaid.
 Shew me a token for good; that they which hate me may see it, and be ashamed: because thou, LORD, hast holpen me, and comforted me.

A prayer of David
The psalm bears the title "A Prayer of David" (tə-p̄i-lāh lə-ḏā-wiḏ). It is one of five psalms labeled as "prayer" (tephillah), and bears a resemblance to Psalm 17, which also has this title (cf. Psalm 90, known as the "prayer of Moses"). This psalm is the only one attributed to David in Book 3 of Psalms (comprising Psalms 73 to 89). The preceding three psalms (Psalms 83-85) and Psalms 87 and 88 are attributed to the sons of Korah.

Analysis
Biblical commentator Cyril Rodd suggests that three parts are transparent in this psalm:

The first, verses 1–7, are 'a plea for help'; in relation to 'the psalmist's piety' (verses 1–4) and 'the character of God' (verses 5–7).
The second, verses 8–13, form a hymn, 'interrupted by a call on God to teach the psalmist' (verse 11), and concluding with 'thankful confidence' for answered prayer, and 'a vow to offer praise'/'sacrifice a thank-offering' (verses 12–13)
The final part, verses 14–17, are 'renewed prayer', ending with a request for a 'sign' or the 'salvation'.

The composition of the psalm features frequent parallels and repetitions, such as an eightfold 'for' (verses 1, 2, 3, 4, 5, 7, 10, 13), the repeated 'Lord' eleven times (verses 1, 3, 4, 5, 6, 8, 9, 11, 12, 15, 17, with seven of them being adonai (verses 3, 4, 5, 8, 9, 12, 15), and the four others as "YHWH". The psalmist is named the 'servant' of YHWH (abdeka; "your servant") in verses 2, 4, 16, which may indicate literary patterns. A chiastic structure has been discovered, with verse 11 in the center:

 1–4
 5–6
7
8–10
11
12–13
14
15
16–17

Verse 1

Uses
Judaism
Verse 5 is part of one of the intermediate paragraphs of Uva Letzion.
Verse 8 is recited when opening the Hakafot on Simchat Torah.
Verses 9-10 are part of Baruch Hashem L'Olam during Maariv.

New Testament
Verse 9 is quoted in Revelation 15:4.

Book of Common Prayer
In the Church of England's Book of Common Prayer, this psalm is appointed to be read on the morning of the 17th day of the month.

 Musical settings 
Several hymns paraphrase Psalm 86 or parts of it, including "Bow down Thine ear, O Lord".

The Renaissance composer Cristóbal de Morales composed a motet in Latin, "Inclina Domine aurem tuam", first published in 1543.Wacław z Szamotuł composed Nakłoń, Panie, ku mnie ucho Twoje song to the Polish translation of Psalm 86 by Mikołaj Rej in the 16th century. Heinrich Schütz set a German metric paraphrase, "Herr, neig zu mir dein gnädigs Ohr" (Lord, bow to me your gracious ear) as part of the 1602 Becker Psalter, as SWV 183. Henry Purcell composed an anthem, Bow down thine ear, O Lord, Z11, in 1681 or earlier. It is based on verses 1, 3–6, 8, 10–12, alternating soloists and choir, with organ.

Andreas Romberg wrote seven psalm settings for different unaccompanied choirs, titled Psalmodie, Op. 65, between 1817 and 1820, using translations into German by Moses Mendelssohn. Psalm 86 is the first, written for a five-part choir SSATB. In Mendelssohn's Elijah, three verses from Psalm 86 are used in the narration of the oratorio. In #2, a duet, the beginning is used to begin a plea, and in #8, the scene between Elijah and the widow, he first paraphrases verse 16 and then quotes verse 15, "for Thou art gracious, and full of compassion and plenteous in mercy and truth", praying to bring her son back to life.

William Crotch set verse 4 as an anthem for choir and organ, Comfort, O Lord, The Soul of Thy Servant. Basil Harwood composed a setting of the psalm for his doctoral thesis in 1896, Inclina domine''. Walter Piston composed a setting in English for four-part choir and piano. Gustav Holst set Psalm 86, together with Psalm 148 in English, "To my humble supplication", for mixed choir, string orchestra and organ in 1912. George Enescu planned a symphony in F minor for baritone, choir and orchestra on text from Psalm 86, but left only fragments c. 1917.

In 1985, Xaver Paul Thoma composed a setting for mezzo-soprano, viola and organ, premiered in 1993 in Karlsruhe-Durlach by Henrike Paede, Jean-Eric Souzy as violist and Hans Martin Corrinth as the organist.

References

Sources

External links 

 
 
 
 Text of Psalm 86 according to the 1928 Psalter
 Psalm 86 – Help from the Great God text and detailed commentary, enduringword.com
 A prayer of David. Incline your ear, LORD, and answer me, for I am poor and oppressed. text and footnotes, usccb.org United States Conference of Catholic Bishops
 Psalm 86:1 introduction and text, biblestudytools.com
 Psalm 86 / Refrain: All nations you have made shall come and worship you, O Lord. Church of England
 Psalm 86 at biblegateway.com
 Calvin's Commentaries, Vol. 10: Psalms, Part III, tr. by John King, (1847-50) / Psalm 86 sacred-texts.com
 

086
Works attributed to David